Tang Jiashu (Chinese: 唐佳庶; Pinyin: Táng Jiāshù; born 22 September 1990) is a Chinese football player who currently plays for Chongqing Lifan in the Chinese Super League.

Club career
Tang joined Zhejiang Green Town youth team system from Genbao Football Base in November 2006. He started his professional football career in 2007 when he was sent to China League Two side Hangzhou Sanchao (Zhejiang Green Town Youth) and played as a regular for the team. Tang was promoted to Hangzhou Greentown's first team squad by Wu Jingui in 2010. On 24 April, he made his Super League debut in a 0–0 home draw against Tianjin Teda, coming on as a substitute for Bari Mamatil in the 72nd minute. He became a regular starter after this match and scored his first Super League goal on 14 July which ensured Hangzhou Greentown beat Changchun Yatai 4–3. Tang made 19 appearances in his first Super League season and helped the club finish fourth place and entry into the 2011 AFC Champions League for the first time. Tang played in all six games for the club in the AFC Champions League as they crashed out within the group stages.

In February 2014, Tang moved to Chinese Super League side Shanghai Shenxin on a one-year loan deal. He transferred to China League One side Beijing Enterprises Group in February 2015.

On 2 January 2018, Tang transferred to Chinese Super League side Chongqing Dangdai Lifan.

International career
Tang played for China U-17 in the 2006 AFC U-17 Championship. On 31 December 2010, he was first called up into China U-23's squad by Miroslav Blažević. He played as a regular starter in the friendly matches but became a substitute in 2012 Summer Olympics Qualifiers as China were eliminated in the Preliminary Round 2 after a 4–1 two-legged knock-out defeat against Oman.

Career statistics 
Statistics accurate as of match played 31 December 2020.

References

External links
 

1990 births
Living people
Chinese footballers
Association football midfielders
Footballers from Shanghai
Zhejiang Professional F.C. players
Shanghai Shenxin F.C. players
Beijing Sport University F.C. players
Chongqing Liangjiang Athletic F.C. players
Chinese Super League players
China League One players
China League Two players